Henry Everett "Hank" Emerson (May 28, 1925 – February 4, 2015) was a United States Army lieutenant general best known for being the commander of the 2nd Infantry Division in South Korea during the mid-1970s, when Colin Powell served as a battalion commander. Emerson was a 1947 graduate of the United States Military Academy.

Military career
Henry Everett Emerson gained recognition during the Vietnam War for his tactical ability on the battlefield. His tactics as a commander were novel. He conceived aerial reconnaissance and combat methods that were employed effectively against the Viet Cong. These included a "checkerboard concept" that involves small groups covering grid squares to seek out an enemy, "jitterbug" tactics which are complex manoeuvres using helicopters to surround an enemy. To the uninitiated this would seem jittery like the dance, and "Eagle Flights" which were helicopters loaded with local soldiers and flown in quickly to assist foreign troops in certain situations. He demonstrated that American soldiers could effectively "out-guerrilla" the Viet Cong. Emerson also developed the "seal-and-pile-on technique" (the rapid build-up of combat power to surround and destroy an enemy force). These highly complex tactics shattered many large enemy units.

Emerson was known for his somewhat eccentric personality, from his training methods to carrying a cowboy-style revolver in place of a regulation M1911 semi-automatic pistol. He was a believer in reverse-cycle training, during which troops trained at night and slept during the day. He also required that they watch the television film Brian's Song, to promote racial harmony. Colin Powell, who would later go on to become a four-star general and the U.S. Secretary of State, has stated that he and Emerson were very close and that what set Emerson apart was his great love of his soldiers and concern for their welfare. When Powell wrote his autobiography, "My American Journey", he dedicated an entire chapter to Emerson. Powell said that Emerson's leadership philosophy was "if we don't do our jobs right Soldiers will not win". In many instances when he was the XVIII Airborne Corps commander he would turn in the tag numbers of excessively speeding vehicles. The next morning, the violator(s) would be escorted by the company and battalion commanders from their unit and a verbal reprimand would be delivered by the brigade commander.

Emerson suffered severe burns after his helicopter was shot down in the Mekong Delta. He had commanded forces during the Vietnam War prior to being stationed in South Korea. He later served as commander of the XVIII Airborne Corps and Fort Bragg, from July 1975 to June 1977. He died at the age of 89 on February 4, 2015.

References

External links

9th Infantry Division: Old Reliables, edited by John Sperry, Turner Publishing Company, 2000, p. 35. 
AARP interview with Colin Powell
Profile on MilitaryTimes
Authorized biography of General Hank Emerson at the U.S. Army Military Institute website

1925 births
2015 deaths
United States Army personnel of the Korean War
United States Army personnel of the Vietnam War
Recipients of the Distinguished Flying Cross (United States)
Recipients of the Distinguished Service Cross (United States)
Recipients of the Distinguished Service Medal (US Army)
Recipients of the Legion of Merit
Recipients of the Silver Star
United States Army generals